Ehrengard Schramm (1900–1985) was a German politician and writer.

1900 births
1985 deaths
Members of the Landtag of Lower Saxony
People from Gryfice
People from the Province of Pomerania
20th-century German women writers
20th-century German women politicians